Serrodes is a genus of moths in the family Erebidae first described by Achille Guenée in 1852.

Description
Costa of the forewings slightly arched before apex. Cilia of forewings and hindwings strongly crenulate. Tibia extremely hairy in both sexes. Mid tibia of male with dense long hair lying along their inner sides. Larva with four abdominal prolegs, with rudimentary first pair.

Species
 Serrodes caesia Warren, 1915
 Serrodes campana Guenée, 1852
 Serrodes flavitincta Hampson, 1926
 Serrodes malgassica Viette, 1972
 Serrodes mediopallens Prout, 1924
 Serrodes partita (Fabricius, 1775)
 Serrodes trispila (Mabille, 1890)
 Serrodes villosipeda Strand, 1910

Former species
 Serrodes curvilinea Prout, 1921
 Serrodes inara Cramer, [1779]
 Serrodes nigha Guenée, 1852
 Serrodes subumbra (Bethune-Baker, 1906)
 Serrodes xanthorrhoea Felder & Rogenhofer, 1874

References

External links
 
 
 

 
Cocytiini
Moth genera